María del Pilar Teresa Cayetana de Silva y Silva-Bazán, 13th Duchess of Alba, GE (10 June 1762 – 23 July 1802), was a Spanish aristocrat and a popular subject of the painter Francisco de Goya.

Biography
María Teresa, as she was called in her family, became the 13th Duchess of Alba in 1776 after inheriting the title from her paternal grandfather, Fernando de Silva, 12th Duke of Alba, who outlived her father. Her marriage the year before to José Álvarez de Toledo Osorio, 11th Marquess of Villafranca (a male-line descendant of Fadrique Álvarez de Toledo, 2nd Duke of Alba), made her and her husband the wealthiest couple in the Kingdom of Spain. Their only rivals to this status were the House of Osuna.

The duchess' relationship with famed Spanish painter Francisco de Goya and her somewhat eccentric personality have contributed greatly to a continuing interest in her life during the two centuries since her death. Goya executed several well-known portraits of the duchess, most of them during his stay at Sanlúcar de Barrameda (one of the Andalusian country seats of the House of Medina Sidonia) shortly after the death in 1796 of her husband, who was also the 15th Duke of Medina Sidonia.

Goya's accompaniment of the recently widowed duchess, combined with certain innuendo expressed in his portraits of her, have exacerbated rumors that the two were lovers. Although this has never been confirmed, the large number of portraits that the artist painted of the duchess suggests, at the very least, a close platonic relationship between the two.

The painting La maja desnuda, executed between 1797 and 1800 by Goya, has also been rumored to portray her. The painting, considered scandalous by Spanish society of the time, depicts a fully nude reclining woman. It, together with a companion piece depicting the same model clothed (La maja vestida), was commissioned by Spanish prime minister Manuel Godoy (the known lover of Spain's queen, María Luisa).

The true identity of the majas is uncertain.  Many art historians over the years have rejected the possibility that the painting depicts the duchess, including Australian art critic Robert Hughes in his 2003 biography, Goya. Those scholars believe that the painting depicts either Godoy's young mistress, Pepita Tudó, or an idealized composite of several different models.

Full Name With Titles
The Duchess's full name with titles in Spanish was Doña María del Pilar Teresa Cayetana de Silva Álvarez de Toledo y Silva Bazán, décimo tercera duquesa de Alba de Tormes, décima primera duquesa de Huéscar, sexta duquesa de Montoro, octava condesa-duquesa de Olivares, décimo primera marquesa del Carpio, décimo tercera marquesa de Coria, novena marquesa de Eliche, décimo segunda marquesa de Villanueva del Río, sexta marquesa de Tarazona, marquesa de Flechilla y Jarandilla, décimo primera condesa de Monterrey, décimo cuarta condesa de Lerín, décimo tercera condesa de Oropesa, décimo cuarta Condestablesa de Navarra, décimo segunda condesa de Galve, décimo cuarta condesa de Osorno, de jure duquesa de Galisteo, décimo primera condesa de Ayala, novena condesa de Fuentes de Valdepero, condesa de Alcaudete, condesa de Deleitosa, señora del estado de Valdecorneja, señora de las baronías de Dicastillo, San Martín, Curton y Guissens.

Death and succession
The duchess died under somewhat mysterious circumstances in July 1802 at the age of 40.  Although her death was ostensibly due to tuberculosis and a fever, more colorful scenarios have been suggested over the years, among them a theory that she was poisoned (this theory was dramatized in the film The Naked Maja). She had no biological children, although she did have an adoptive daughter, known as María de la Luz.

After her death, the Alba ducal title passed to a relative, Carlos Miguel Fitz-James Stuart (1794–1835), who became the 14th Duke of Alba.

Ancestry

Images by Francisco de Goya

Doubted to represent the duchess

References

Sources

External links 
 

1762 births
1802 deaths
18th-century Spanish nobility
Maria Cayetana
19th-century deaths from tuberculosis
Maria Cayetana
Dukes of Huéscar
Grandees of Spain
Maria Cayetana
Tuberculosis deaths in Spain
Spanish artists' models
Spanish salon-holders
Works by Francisco Goya
Marquesses of Carpio
19th-century Spanish nobility